Zenobuurt is a neighborhood of Rotterdam, Netherlands.

Neighbourhoods of Rotterdam